Stone Sour is an American rock band from Des Moines, Iowa. Originally formed in 1992 by vocalist Corey Taylor, guitarist Josh Rand, bassist Shawn Economaki and drummer Joel Ekman, the band was active until 1997, when Taylor left to join Slipknot. Guitarist Jim Root, who had joined the band later, also joined Slipknot in 1999. Stone Sour reunited several years later, releasing its full-length debut album Stone Sour in 2002 which featured songs from early demos. Ekman was replaced by Roy Mayorga in 2006, who performed on the band's second album Come What(ever) May. The songs on the album were written by Taylor, Root, Rand and Economaki.

The band took regular breaks due to the schedule of Slipknot, but returned in 2010 with third album Audio Secrecy, which featured equal songwriting credits for all five band members. In 2011 the group contributed the song "The Pessimist" to the Transformers: Dark of the Moon soundtrack, before Economaki left the following year. House of Gold & Bones: Part 1 was released later in the year, followed by Part 2 in 2013, both of which featured Rachel Bolan on bass. Root left Stone Sour in late 2013 and was later replaced by Christian Martucci. In 2015 the band released two extended plays (EPs) of cover versions: Meanwhile in Burbank... and Straight Outta Burbank...

Songs

Notes

References

External links
List of Stone Sour songs at AllMusic
Stone Sour official website

Stone Sour